A reflex camera is a camera that permits the photographer to view the image that will be seen through the lens, and therefore to see exactly what will be captured, contrary to viewfinder cameras where the image could be significantly different from what will be captured.

Variations

A single-lens reflex camera typically uses a mirror and prism system (hence "reflex", from the mirror's reflection) to accomplish this. The mirrorless interchangeable-lens camera achieves the same result by providing the photographer with a digitally captured image. The twin-lens reflex camera provides both a viewfinder image by reflecting the image onto ground glass and an image through another lens to the film. The image exposing the film is not reflected.

See also
single-lens reflex camera

Cameras by type